Veternik or Veterniku ( or Veterniku) is a mountain in Kosovo. It is located nearby Kopranik, a mountain higher than Veternik but also found in the same range. Veternik differs somewhat from the rest of the Prokletije of Kosovo and resembles more the Albanian part of the range. This is because Veternik's slopes are steep and its limestone is exposed.

Notes and references

Notes:

References:

Mountains of Kosovo
Accursed Mountains
Two-thousanders of Kosovo